The Association of Library and Information Professionals of the Czech Republic (SKIP) is a Czech professional organization of librarians and information professionals. It was established in 1968, dissolved in 1970 during the "normalization" period in Czechoslovakia, and re-established in 1990 after the Velvet Revolution. The association has both individual and institutional members (libraries and information institutions). Alongside its headquarters in Prague, SKIP is organised into 11 regional committees.

The association's objectives are to improve the standards of library and information services, to increase the profession’s prestige, to support the development of libraries and information institutions, and to represent the interests of its members. The association publishes the quarterly newsletter Bulletin SKIP. It is a member of the International Federation of Library Associations and Institutions.

Special interest groups

Public Libraries Section
Educational Section
Employers’ Section
Children Libraries Club
School Libraries Club
Academic Librarians Club
Francophone Club
Health Libraries Group
Editorial Commission
Commission for Foreign Relations

References

Further reading

External links
SKIP website

Libraries in the Czech Republic
Library-related professional associations
Library associations
Non-profit organizations based in the Czech Republic
1968 establishments in Czechoslovakia
Organizations established in 1990